The Lesotho Fed Cup team represents Lesotho in Fed Cup tennis competition and are governed by the Lesotho Lawn Tennis Association. They have not competed since 2001.

History
Lesotho competed in its first Fed Cup in 2000.  Their best result was finishing fourth in their Group II pool in 2001.

See also
Fed Cup
Lesotho Davis Cup team

External links

Billie Jean King Cup teams
Fed Cup
Fed Cup